The Ministry of Defense of Peru is the government ministry responsible for safeguarding national security on land, sea and air. It exercises command over the Peruvian Armed Forces composed of the Army, the Navy and the Air Force. , the minister of defense is Jorge Chávez.

History
The Ministry of Defense of Peru was created by Law No. 24654 on 1 April 1987, during the government of President Alan García. It absorbed the previous Ministries of War, Navy and Aeronautics as well as the Comando Conjunto de las Fuerzas Armadas (Joint Chiefs of Staff) and the National Defence Secretariat.

Organization
The government agency under his command is organized as follows:
 Secretaría General (General Secretariat)
 Viceministerio de Asuntos Administrativos y Económicos (Viceministry of Administrative and Economic Matters)
 Viceministerio de Asuntos Logísticos y de Personal (Viceministry of Logistics and Personnel Matters)
 Dirección Nacional de Política y Estrategia (National Directorate of Politics and Strategy)
 Comando Conjunto de las Fuerzas Armadas (Joint Command of the Armed Forces)
 Ejército del Perú (Peruvian Army)
 Marina de Guerra del Perú (Peruvian Navy)
 Fuerza Aérea del Perú (Peruvian Air Force)

See also
List of Ministers of Defense of Peru

References

External links
 Official Website 

Peru
Defense
Military of Peru
Peru, Defense